Elizabeth Joyce Smith  (born 1956) is an Australian Anglican priest and hymnist. She has published three collections of hymns, and several of her hymns have been included in the ecumenical hymnal Together in Song. Ordained a deacon in the Anglican Church in Australia in 1987, Smith became a priest in 1993. She earned a PhD from the Pacific School of Religion, where she focused on feminist hermeneutics and liturgical studies. Her doctoral thesis was published in 1999, with the title Bearing Fruit in Due Season: Feminist Hermeneutics and the Bible in Worship. She has served on the Liturgy Commission for the Anglican Church of Australia since 1997. In 2018, she was commissioned to write a hymn for the installation of Archbishop Kay Goldsworthy.  In 2020, she was appointed a Member of the Order of Australia for her contributions to liturgical scholarship and to the Anglican Church of Australia.

Biography

Elizabeth Joyce Smith was born in Stawell, Victoria, Australia in 1956. She attended secondary school in Euroa, Victoria.  From 1974 to 1978, she studied at Monash University in Melbourne, and at the University of Melbourne.  

Smith earned a Bachelor of Divinity at the Trinity College Theological School in 1986, and was ordained as a deacon in the Anglican Church in Australia the following year.  At the time, women were not allowed to be ordained to the priesthood.  From 1987 to 1989, she served as an assistant curate in St. Eanswythe Church in Altona, Victoria, in the Anglican Diocese of Melbourne. She then served another two years as an assistant curate at St Stephen's Church in Mount Waverley, Victoria, from 1990 to 1991.

In 1992, after many years of debate, women's ordination was approved within the Anglican Church of Australia. Smith was ordained as a priest in June 1993.  

Smith pursued liturgical studies at the Pacific School of Religion, in California, where she obtained her PhD in 1995. Her thesis was published in 1999, as Bearing Fruit in Due Season: Feminist Hermeneutics and the Bible in Worship. She has been a member of the Societas Liturgica since 1995.  Smith was appointed to the Liturgy Commission for the Anglican Church in Australia in 1997, becoming the Executive Secretary in 2011.  

From 1995 to 2008, Smith served as the priest at St John's Church in Bentleigh, Victoria. She became dean of the Glen Eira area in 1997, serving in this role for three years. In 2008, she moved to the Diocese of Perth, where she served as the Mission Plan Coordinator and Mission Development Coordinator from 2008 to 2015.  

Since 2015, Smith has served as a mission priest (Anglican) in the Parish of the Goldfields in Western Australia. She also serves as the area dean.  She works part-time as a chaplain for the Amana Living Aged Care and School of Mines.

Hymns 
Smith is best known as a feminist hymnologist who uses inclusive language and non-hierarchical images in her writing.  In an interview, she is quoted as saying that she tries "to be inclusive in [her] writing and preaching – of women, and of all the other people God loves but the church often overlooks or excludes." 

Smith published her first collection, Praise the God of Grace, in 1990, while working as the assistant curate at St. Stephens Anglican Church. She subsequently published two additional collections of hymns: Rejoice! For God Has Called Us, published in 1993, and Songs for a Hopeful Church, published in 1997.

Several of Smith's hymns are included in an ecumenical hymnal, Together in Song, which was published in Australia in 1999. 

 "Where wide sky rolls down" - Hymn #188
"Holy Spirit, go before us" - Hymn #420
"Love will be our lenten calling" - Hymn #684 (copyright 1997)
 "God gives us a future" - Hymn #687
 "Faith will not grow from words alone" - Hymn #691
Two other hymns are included in other collections:

 "Holy Spirit, Living Water", published in Songs of Grace: Supplement to Together in Song, Australian Hymn Book II
 "God in the darkness, God beyond our knowing", Hymn # 17 in More Voices
In 2018, she authored "Nothing Less than Love Has Saved Us"; written for the installation of Archbishop Kay Goldworthy

Honours 

At the 2020 Queen's Birthday Honours, Smith was appointed a Member of the Order of Australia for her contributions to liturgical scholarship and to the Anglican Church of Australia.

Works 
 Praise the God of Grace: Hymns for Inclusive Worship (1990) 
 Rejoice!: For God Has Called Us: Hymns for Inclusive Worship (1993) 
 Songs for a Hopeful Church: Words for Inclusive Worship (1997) 
Bearing Fruit in Due Season: Feminist Hermeneutics and the Bible in Worship (1999) 
 Prayers & Plays for Christmas and Holy Week (2006)

See also 

 Anglican church music
 Inclusive language

References

1956 births
Living people
Australian Anglican priests
Members of the Order of Australia
Monash University alumni
University of Melbourne alumni
University of Melbourne women
20th-century Australian women
21st-century Australian women
People from Stawell, Victoria